Monty Python Live is a two-disc DVD set featuring three TV specials and a live concert film of the British comedy group Monty Python. The set includes:

 Monty Python Live at the Hollywood Bowl
 Parrot Sketch Not Included – 20 Years of Monty Python
 Monty Python Live at Aspen
 The first episode of Monty Python's Fliegender Zirkus

References 

Live